Scoparia albifrons is a moth in the family Crambidae. It was described by Herbert Druce in 1896. It is found in Colombia.

References

Moths described in 1896
Scorparia
Moths of South America